Apeyadana (also spelled Abeyadana) was the chief queen consort of King Kyansittha of the Pagan Dynasty of Burma (Myanmar) and maternal grandmother of King Sithu I of Pagan. She married Kyansittha when he was just a young officer in the army, before his coronation.  She was succeeded as the chief queen by Thanbula.

The Apeyadana Temple in Bagan (Pagan) is named after the queen.

Popular culture
 Portrayed by May Than Nu in Kyan Sit Min (2005) film.

References

Bibliography
 
 

Chief queens consort of Pagan
1040s births
1100s deaths
11th-century Burmese women